For the airport serving Willoughby, Ohio assigned the ICAO code KLNN, see Willoughby Lost Nation Municipal Airport.

KLNN (103.7 FM), known as Luna, is a radio station broadcasting an adult contemporary format. Licensed to Questa, New Mexico, United States. The station is currently owned by ASKK Media.  KLNN began broadcasting in October 2006 and serves the Taos County area, operating a booster station (KLNN-FM1) in the town of Taos.

ASKK Media bought KLNN from West Waves, Inc. for $355,000 in 2010.

References

External links

LNN
Mass media in Taos, New Mexico